Beaty may refer to:

Beaty (surname)
Beaty, Illinois, U.S., unincorporated community in Fulton County
Beaty Crossroads, Alabama, U.S., unincorporated community on Sand Mountain in northern DeKalb County

See also
Beatty (disambiguation)
Batey (disambiguation)